Rakaia is a town seated close to the southern banks of the Rakaia River on the Canterbury Plains in New Zealand's South Island, approximately 57 km south of Christchurch on State Highway 1 and the Main South Line. Immediately north of the township are New Zealand's longest road bridge and longest rail bridge, both of which cross the wide shingle beds of the braided river at this point. Both bridges are approximately 1750 metres in length.

Rakaia was also the junction of the Methven Branch, a branch line railway to Methven that operated from 1880 until its closure in 1976. An accident at the railway station in 1899 killed four people.

Rakaia's most obvious feature is a large fibreglass salmon. The river from which the town takes its name is known for its salmon fishing and jetboating.

The town and river were previously known as Cholmondeley, but the Maori name would eventually prevail over the English one.

The rural community of Acton is located south of the Rakaia township.

Demographics 

Rakaia had a population of 1,440 at the 2018 New Zealand census, an increase of 168 people (13.2%) since the 2013 census, and an increase of 369 people (34.5%) since the 2006 census. There were 576 households, with 582 occupied private dwellings and a further 72 unoccupied private dwellings.. There were 723 males and 720 females, giving a sex ratio of 1.0 males per female. The median age was 42.3 years (compared with 37.4 years nationally), with 303 people (21.0%) aged under 15 years, 225 (15.6%) aged 15 to 29, 657 (45.6%) aged 30 to 64, and 255 (17.7%) aged 65 or older.

Ethnicities were 86.9% European/Pākehā, 12.9% Māori, 5.2% Pacific peoples, 3.3% Asian, and 1.7% other ethnicities (totals add to more than 100% since people could identify with multiple ethnicities).

The proportion of people born overseas was 12.3%, compared with 27.1% nationally.

Although some people objected to giving their religion, 53.1% had no religion, 34.8% were Christian, 0.4% were Hindu, 0.2% were Muslim, 0.6% were Buddhist and 2.5% had other religions.

Of those at least 15 years old, 93 (8.2%) people had a bachelor or higher degree, and 330 (29.0%) people had no formal qualifications. The median income was $33,500, compared with $31,800 nationally, with 11.8% earning over $70,000. The employment status of those at least 15 was that 636 (55.9%) people were employed full-time, 162 (14.2%) were part-time, and 24 (2.1%) were unemployed.

Notable buildings

Saint Mark's Anglican Church 
Saint Marks was built in 1877. It was designed by architect Benjamin Mountfort in a Gothic style. It is considered a typical example of the wooden churches he designed for small parishes. The church was listed as a category two historic place in 1992.

Rakaia Post Office 

The Rakaia Post Office was built in 1910.

Bank of New Zealand 

The Rakaia Bank of New Zealand building.

South Rakaia Hotel 
The South Rakaia Hotel is almost 150 years old.

St Andrews Presbyterian Church

References

External links

Rakaia Tourism
About Rakaia

Ashburton District
Populated places in Canterbury, New Zealand